Brent Turner (born February 25, 1954) is an American sprint canoer who competed in the mid-1970s. He was eliminated in the repechages of the K-4 1000 m event at the 1976 Summer Olympics in Montreal.

References
Sports-Reference.com profile

1954 births
American male canoeists
Canoeists at the 1976 Summer Olympics
Living people
Olympic canoeists of the United States
Place of birth missing (living people)